Keita Goto may be:

Keita Goto (footballer), Japanese football player
Keita Gotō (industrialist), Japanese industrialist and founder of the Tokyu Group